Ewo is a district in the Cuvette-Ouest Region of western Republic of the Congo. The capital lies at Ewo.

Towns and villages

References

Cuvette-Ouest Department
Districts of the Republic of the Congo